This is a list of insect galls arranged into families.

Coleoptera Beetles

Curculionidae Weevills 
Weevils
Dorytomus taeniatus

CerambycidaeLonghorned beetles

Saperda populnea    Small Poplar Borer

Diptera Flies

Anthomyiidae Anthomyiid Flies

 Chirosia betuleti Knotting Gall

Agromyzidae Leaf-Miner Flies

Hexomyza simplicoides

Cecidomyiidae  Gall Midges

Tephritidae Fruit Flies 
{{columns-list|colwidth=15em|
 Aciurina bigeloviae Cotton-gall Tephritid
 Aciurina thoracica Desert Broom Gallfly 
Aciurina trixa Bubble-gall Tephritid
 Procecidochares atra Goldenrod Brussels Sprout Gall Fly
' 'Procecidochares kristineae Bud-gall Tephritid
 Eurosta solidaginis   Goldenrod Gall Fly  
 Tephritis bardanae Burdock Fly Tephritis neesii Oxeye Daisy Fly
 Urophora cardui    Canada thistle gall fly 
 Urophora jaceana Knapweed Gall-Fly 
}}

Hemiptera
Adelgidae
 Adelges abietis   Pineapple gall adelgid 

Aphididae

AphalaridaePachypsylla celtidismamma    Hackberry Nipplegall Maker 
 Pachypsylla celtidisasterisca  Hackberry Star Gall Psyllid 
 Pachypsylla celtidisvesicula   Hackberry Blistergall Psyllid 
 Pachypsylla venusta Hackberry Petiole Gall Psylli

Eriococcidae felt scales 
 Cylindrococcus spiniferus  Casuarina Gall

Phylloxeridae
 Daktulosphaira vitifoliae Grape phylloxera
Psyllidae
 Psyllopsis fraxini Ash Psyllid
 Psylla buxi   Boxwood Psyllid

Triozidae Jumping Plant Lice
 Bactericera albiventris 
 Trioza alacris Bay Sucker
 Trioza centranthi Valerian Psyllid
 Trioza remotaHymenoptera
Cynipidae Gall wasps  

Eriococcidae Felt Scales Apiomorpha munita  Four-winged GallApiomorpha duplex Two-tailed Gumtree Gall

Eulophidae
 ArastichusTenthredinidae
 Euura amerinae and list

Lepidoptera Moths and Butterflies

Elachistidae a Moth genus 
 Blastodacna atra    Apple Pith Moth

Gelechiidae  Twirler Moths 
 Gnorimoschema baccharisella Coyote Brush Stem Gall Moth
 Gnorimoschema gallaesolidaginis    Solidago Gall Moth

Heliozelidae
 Heliozela sericiella Oak Satin Lift

Momphidae Mompha Moths  
 Mompha bradleyi New Neat Cosmet
 Mompha divisella Neat Cosmet
 Mompha sturnipennella Kentish Cosmet

Nepticulidae Midget Moths 
 Ectoedemia populella  Poplar petiole gall mothh

SesiidaeClearwing moths 
 Synanthedon flaviventris   Sallow Clearwing 
 Synanthedon formicaeformis   Red-Tipped Clearwing

Tortricidae Tortrix Moths or Leafroller Moths   
 Cydia millenniana   Larch Gall Moth 
 Cydia servillana''   Sallow-shoot Piercer

References

Gall-inducing insects
Oak galls
Willow galls
Lists of insects